is a private university in the Aoi ward of Shizuoka City, Japan.

The predecessor of the school was founded in 1946, and it was chartered as a university in 1980. The university is operated by the foundation that also operates Tokoha Gakuen Junior College.  In April 2013, change the name to Tokoha University from Tokoha Gakuen University.

External links
 Official website 

Educational institutions established in 1946
Private universities and colleges in Japan
Buildings and structures in Shizuoka (city)
Universities and colleges in Shizuoka Prefecture
1946 establishments in Japan